Cubebenes are a pair of chemical compounds, classified as sesquiterpenes, first isolated from Piper cubeba berries, known as cubebs.  

The volatile oil from the distillation of cubebs is a pale green or blue-yellow viscous liquid with a warm woody, slightly camphoraceous odor consisting of cubebene which comes in two forms, α- and β-cubebene, both with the molecular formula C15H24.  They differ only in the position of a double bond which is endocyclic (part of the five-membered ring) in α-cubebene, but exocyclic in β-cubebene.

References

Sesquiterpenes